Liina-Grete Lilender (born October 14, 1979 in Tallinn) is an Estonian figure skater. She is the 1997 Estonian national champion and a multiple silver- and bronze-medalist at that competition. She placed 21st in the qualifying round at the 1997 World Figure Skating Championships. As a university student, she placed 22nd at the 2003 Winter Universiade and 32nd at the 2005 Winter Universiade.

She currently works as a coach at the Tallinn figure skating club

References

External links
 
 Tracings.net profile

Estonian female single skaters
1979 births
Figure skaters from Tallinn
Living people
Competitors at the 2003 Winter Universiade
Competitors at the 2005 Winter Universiade